The Up Stream Put-In Site, also known as 20DK27, is an archaeological site located near Kingsford, Michigan.  The location was a campsite and water access associated with both the Woodland period and historic Euro-American use.   It was listed on the National Register of Historic Places in 1995.

References

Dickinson County, Michigan
Archaeological sites on the National Register of Historic Places in Michigan
National Register of Historic Places in Dickinson County, Michigan